The Deputy Secretary-General of the Commonwealth assists the Secretary-General in managing the operations of the Commonwealth Secretariat, which is the central institution of the Commonwealth. The current Deputy Secretary-General is Dr Arjoon Suddhoo of Mauritius. Dr Suddhoo's appointment was announced in February 2019 after an open and competitive process, and he took up the post in April 2019.

History
Until 2016, three Commonwealth Deputy Secretaries-General assisted the Secretary-General in running the Commonwealth Secretariat, each assigned an aspect of the Commonwealth's function to address particularly: one to economic affairs, one to political affairs and the other to corporate affairs.

They were elected by the Commonwealth Heads of Government, like the Secretary-General.  However, as their terms overlap with those of the Secretary-General, and don't coincide with Commonwealth Heads of Government Meetings (CHOGMs), the Heads of Government are represented through their respective High Commissioners in London. Originally, the Secretariat only engaged two Deputy Secretaries-General, whilst the Corporate Affairs portfolio was overseen by an Assistant Secretary-General. This changed in 2014 with the appointment of Gary Dunn from Australia to the post. However, by the end of March 2017, references to the role and Dunn had been removed from the Secretariat's website, indicating that the role may have been abolished though no announcement had been made to that effect.

Under Baroness Scotland's tenure as Secretary-General, the vacancies left by the departures of Dunn, Deodat Maharaj, and Josephine Ojiambo were not filled and the three roles merged into a single post.

Lists of Deputy Secretaries-General

Economic Affairs and Development

Political Affairs

1 Initially served from 1977 to 1983, leaving his?? post for a few months to serve as Minister of Foreign Affairs in Nigeria. He was re-instated later that year.

Corporate Affairs

Footnotes

 
Institutions of the Commonwealth of Nations